The 1976–77 New York Islanders season was the fifth season for the franchise in the National Hockey League.

Offseason

Regular season

Final standings

Schedule and results

Playoffs

Preliminary

(4) New York Islanders vs. (12) Chicago Black Hawks

Semifinals

(1) Montreal Canadiens vs. (4) New York Islanders

Player statistics

Note: Pos = Position; GP = Games played; G = Goals; A = Assists; Pts = Points; +/- = plus/minus; PIM = Penalty minutes; PPG = Power-play goals; SHG = Short-handed goals; GWG = Game-winning goals
      MIN = Minutes played; W = Wins; L = Losses; T = Ties; GA = Goals-against; GAA = Goals-against average; SO = Shutouts;

Awards and records

Transactions

Draft picks
New York's draft picks at the 1976 NHL Amateur Draft held in Montreal, Quebec.

Farm teams

See also
 1976–77 NHL season

References

External links

New York Islanders seasons
New York Islanders
New York Islanders
New York Islanders
New York Islanders